Hector Alfredo D'Angelo  is a former Argentina football player and manager. He has managed El Salvador national football team, Banfield, Lanus, Talleres (RE) and Temperley.

References
 
 
 
 
 

Living people
Argentine football managers
Year of birth missing (living people)
Association football midfielders
Argentine footballers
Club Atlético Banfield footballers
Club Atlético Huracán footballers
El Salvador national football team managers
Club Atlético Banfield managers
Talleres de Remedios de Escalada managers